The Clemens Nathan Research Centre (CNRC) is a human rights organisation that focuses on organising international conferences with speakers from multidisciplinary fields and on publishing edited books and conference proceedings. It was founded in 2004, when Clemens N. Nathan (1933-2015, and the Centre's first chairman) was persuaded to start a research centre as an arm of the Consultative Council of Jewish Organisations. Whilst Nathan's career was in textiles, he worked for numerous Jewish causes, as well as international Human Rights and interfaith relations. Nathan was described by the Human Rights NGO Rene Cassin as "the human of human rights". The CNRC's first director was Alan Stephens. Leif Holmstrom, from the Raoul Wallenberg Institute of Human Rights and Humanitarian Law, Lund, described the CNRC as having succeeded "in launching and sustaining useful and constructive events and programmes which have had a beneficial and measurable impact on the improvement of Human Rights.". The CNRC has "stimulated and facilitated discussion, research and study on a striking array of topics, including international organisations, Human Rights, interfaith relations and the Holocaust and German-Jewish history".

The aim of the CNRC has been to organise, sponsor and enable conferences and discussions about various fields of human rights, usually every two years, to include leading academics, lawyers, practitioners and advisors. Co-sponsors have included the Anglo-Jewish Association, Redress, the European Atlantic Group, Essex Human Rights Centre, and the Essex Transitional Justice Network.

The Centre's chairman was invited to speak and lecture on issues related to human rights. Clemens Nathan took part in numerous events, including a seminar at the Essex Human Rights Centre (at a conference on 'Colonialism, Slavery, Reparations and Trade: Remedying the Past?), talks at the University of Pennsylvania on 'Human Rights in the 21st Century', and a keynote paper at the ETJN International Conference on Rehabilitation and Transitional Justice (2012), published in the International Human Rights Law Review in 2016.

References

External links 
 Clemens Nathan Research Centre

Human rights organisations based in the United Kingdom
Interfaith organizations
Research in the United Kingdom